The South African Graded and Black Type races are published each year by the National Horse Racing Authority of South Africa. A number of stakes races also take place which are not graded or granted Black Type and are raced as Non-Black Type races.

Grade 1

Grade 2

Grade 3

Listed

Non-Black Type

References 

Horse racing in South Africa